

By type 

 List of poems in Chinese or by Chinese poets

 List of epic poems
 List of long poems in English
 List of nursery rhymes
 List of poets portraying sexual relations between women
 List of U.S. state poems
 List of world folk-epics

By author

 List of Brontë poems
 List of poems by Ivan Bunin

 List of poems by Catullus

 List of Emily Dickinson poems

 List of poems by Robert Frost
 List of poems by John Keats

 List of poems by Philip Larkin
 List of poems by Samuel Taylor Coleridge
 List of poems by Walt Whitman
 List of poems by William Wordsworth

 List of works by Andrew Marvell
 List of William McGonagall poems
 List of poems by Samuel Menashe

 List of poems by Wilfred Owen

 Poems by Edgar Allan Poe
 Poetry of Sappho

 List of Tolkien's alliterative verse

Collections 
 List of poetry anthologies
 List of poetry collections